Misgar may refer to:

 Mazgar, a village in East Azerbaijan Province of Iran.
 Misgar, Gojal, a village in Gojal region of Pakistan.